Sally Head is a British television producer. She began as a television script editor, then worked as a producer, mainly for the BBC. Her credits as producer include First Born (1988) and The Life and Loves of a She-Devil (1986), and she was executive producer of the first four Prime Suspect television films. She also worked on seminal Granada dramas such as Cracker and Band of Gold.

She founded Sally Head Productions, her own production company, in 1997 with co-directors Gwenda Bagshaw, John Howard and Sarah Simpson.

Television credits
 Fanny Hill (2007)
 A Good Murder (2006)
 Fingersmith (2005) 
 The Return (2003)
 The Mayor of Casterbridge (2003) 
 Tipping the Velvet (2002) 
 The Cry  (2002) 
 Four Fathers (1999)
 Plastic Man (1999)
 Jumping the Queue (1989) 
 First Born (1988)
 The Marksman (1987)
 Breaking Up (1986)
 The Life and Loves of a She-Devil (1986)
 The Detective (1985)

References

External links
 Sally Head Productions website
 

British television producers
British women television producers
Year of birth missing (living people)
Living people